Florence Lake (born Florence Silverlake, November 27, 1904 – April 11, 1980) was an American actress best known as the leading lady in most of the Edgar Kennedy comedy shorts.

Early life
Lake was born in Charleston, South Carolina. In the early 1900s, her father and uncle toured with a circus in an aerial act known as "The Flying Silverlakes". Her mother, Edith Goodwin, was an actress. Her parents later appeared in vaudeville in a skit "Family Affair", traveling throughout the South and Southwest United States. Florence and her younger brother Arthur Silverlake, Jr. became part of the act in 1910. Their mother brought the children to Hollywood to get into the burgeoning film industry. Arthur changed his professional name to Arthur Lake and later achieved great success as "Dagwood Bumstead" in the Blondie movie series.

Early career
Before acting in films, Lake was the leading lady for the Raynor Lehr stock theater company. Her film debut came in New Year's Eve (1929).

Comic acting persona
Lake was petite, with a high-pitched speaking voice. She perfected a comical singsong delivery that established her in "dumb" roles. She personified flightiness in the Kennedy shorts, as the scatterbrained Mrs. Kennedy. After the series ended upon Kennedy's death in 1948, she continued to play character roles in films and television. Her best-known TV role was Jenny, the Calverton telephone operator in Lassie. Lake played the role for the entire ten year "farm seasons" of the show (1954–1964), thus becoming the Lassie player with the longest run on the series. She played the role of Mama Angel in "The Angel and the Outlaw", a 1957 episode of the TV series The Lone Ranger.  She also appeared in the first color episode of the TV series Superman in 1957 as a cave woman.

On old-time radio, Lake portrayed Jessie in Charlie and Jessie, Tess Terwilliger in David Harum, Mrs. Featherstone's daughter in The Gay Mrs. Featherstone, and Miss Smith in Phone Again Finnegan.

In her later years, Lake appeared as Elvira Norton on an episode of Dragnet entitled "Frauds". She appeared in an episode of the 1973 situation comedy A Touch of Grace, and later that year played a blind date for the character Lou Grant on The Mary Tyler Moore Show episode, "Lou's First Date". Her last roles were in the TV series Emergency!, Baretta in 1976, and Most Wanted in 1977.

Selected filmography

 New Year's Eve (1929) - Pearl
 Thru Different Eyes (1929) - Myrtle
 The Rogue Song (1930) - Nadja
 Romance (1930) - Susan Van Tuyl
 The Drums of Jeopardy (1931) - Anya Karlov
 The Spirit of Notre Dame (1931) - Trixie Hayes (uncredited)
 Secret Service (1931) - Miss Caroline Mitford
 Ladies of the Jury (1932) - Mrs. Dace (uncredited)
 Night World (1932) - Ms. Smith (uncredited)
 Westward Passage (1932) - Elmer's Wife
 Frisco Jenny (1932) - Ticklish Girl (uncredited)
 Midshipman Jack (1933) - Sally Withers
 The Sweetheart of Sigma Chi (1933) - Dizzy
 Only Yesterday (1933) - One of Jim's Friends (uncredited)
 Jimmy and Sally (1933) - Marlowe Employee (uncredited)
 Two-Fisted (1935) - Doris Pritchard (uncredited)
 Muss 'Em Up (1936) - Tony's Girlfriend (uncredited)
 The Singing Kid (1936) - Young Woman (scenes deleted)
 Women Are Trouble (1936) - Clara (uncredited)
 To Mary – with Love (1936) - Salesgirl
 Quality Street (1937) - Henrietta Turnbull (uncredited)
 Love in a Bungalow (1937) - The 'Ga-Ga' Prospect
 I Met My Love Again (1938) - Carol Towner
 Condemned Women (1938) - Prisoner
 Law of the Underworld (1938) - Mrs. Billy Winters (uncredited)
 Rebellious Daughters (1938) - Dizzy
 Having Wonderful Time (1938) - Camp Guest (uncredited)
 Next Time I Marry (1938) - Justice of the Peace's Wife (uncredited)
 Dramatic School (1938) - Factory Worker (uncredited)
 Convicts at Large (1938) - Hattie
 Pacific Liner (1939) - Miss Smith - Dancing with Crusher (uncredited)
 Stagecoach (1939) - Mrs. Nancy Whitney (uncredited)
 Union Pacific (1939) - Woman (uncredited)
 Bachelor Mother (1939) - Oliver's Wife (uncredited)
 When Tomorrow Comes (1939) - Waitress (uncredited)
 5th Ave Girl (1939) - Slavey - the Cook's Helper (uncredited)
 Four Jacks and a Jill (1942) - Counter Girl (uncredited)
 Scattergood Survives a Murder (1942) - Phoebe Quentin
 Crash Dive (1943) - Doris - Jean's Roommate (uncredited)
 Hi'ya, Sailor (1943) - Secretary
 Her Primitive Man (1944) - Miss Crims (uncredited)
 Casanova Brown (1944) - Nurse Phillips (uncredited)
 San Diego, I Love You (1944) - Miss Lake
 Goin' to Town (1944) - Abigail
 Hi, Beautiful (1944) - Mrs. Bisbee
 George White's Scandals (1945) - Mother (scenes deleted)
 Riverboat Rhythm (1946) - Penelope Beeler Witherspoon
 Little Giant (1946) - (uncredited)
 The Time, the Place and the Girl (1946) - Kathy (uncredited)
 All Gummed Up (1947, Short) - Aged Serena (uncredited)
 My Wild Irish Rose (1947) - Diner at White Horse Tavern (uncredited)
 The Stratton Story (1949) - Mrs. Appling (uncredited)
 Ambush (1950) - Mrs. Wolverson (uncredited)
 Man from the Black Hills (1952) - Martha
 Fargo (1952) - Maggie
 The Maverick (1952) - Grandma Watson
 Bubble Trouble (1953, Short) - Old Serena Flint
 She Couldn't Say No (1953) - Mrs. Gruman (uncredited)
 The Flaming Urge (1953) - Mrs. Binger
 Bitter Creek (1954) - Mrs. Hammond
 The Desperado (1954) - Mrs. Cameron
 The Lone Ranger (1955) - Season 5 Episode 34 - Emmy Corkle
 The Boss (1956) - Waitress (uncredited)
 Petticoat Junction (1966 - S3Ep30) as Mrs. Latimer
 The Ghost and Mr. Chicken (1966) - Occult Clubwoman (uncredited)
 The Big Mouth (1967) - Assaulted Lady (uncredited)
 Savage Intruder (1970) - Mildred
 Adam 12 The Grandmothers (1971) as Mrs. Frieda Pine
 Time to Run (1973)
 Frasier, the Sensuous Lion (1973) - Old Woman on Porch
 Mary Tyler Moore  (1973), Series 4, episode 8, “Lou’s First Date” - Martha Dudley
 Welcome to Arrow Beach (1974) - Landlady
 The Day of the Locust (1975) - Lee Sisters #2
 Emergency! (1976-S5Ep18) - as Maggie

References

External links

 
 

1904 births
1980 deaths
20th-century American actresses
American film actresses
American television actresses
Actresses from California
People from Greater Los Angeles
Actresses from Charleston, South Carolina
Burials at Woodlawn Memorial Cemetery, Santa Monica